Roganie Govender is a British-South African speech and language therapist. She is a consultant clinical academic speech and language therapist at University College London Hospitals NHS Foundation Trust.

Biography
Govender trained as a speech pathologist and audiologist in South Africa. She gained a master's degree in Communication Pathology in 1998 and, in 2018, a PhD in Behavioural Science and Health from UCL. From 2000 she worked at the Royal Free Hospital in London until June 2005 when she joined the UCLH.

She was awarded a MBE in the 2021 New Year Honours for her services to speech and language therapy.

Select publications
Govender, R., Behanna, K., Brady, G., Coffey, M., Babb, M., and Patterson, J.M. 2021. "Shielding, hospital admission and mortality among 1216 people with total laryngectomy in the UK during the COVID-19 pandemic: A cross-sectional survey from the first national lockdown", International Journal of Language and Communication Disorders 56 (5), 1064–1073. 
Govender, R., Smith, C.H., Taylor, S.A., Grey, D., Wardle, J., and Gardner, B. 2015. "Identification of behaviour change components in swallowing interventions for head and neck cancer patients: protocol for a systematic review", Systematic Reviews 4.  
Allen, J.E., Clunie, G.M., Slinger, C., Haines, J., Mossey-Gaston, C., Zaga, C.J., Scott, B., Wallace, S., and Govender, R. 2022. "Utility of ultrasound in the assessment of swallowing and laryngeal function: A rapid review and critical appraisal of the literature", International Journal of Language and Communication Disorders 56 (1), 174–204.

References

British women academics
Speech and language pathologists
Members of the Order of the British Empire
University of Pretoria alumni
University of KwaZulu-Natal alumni
University College London Hospitals NHS Foundation Trust
Alumni of University College London
Living people
Year of birth missing (living people)